Ben Vaughn is an American singer, songwriter, musician, record producer, composer for television and film, and syndicated radio show host.

Biography

Ben Vaughn grew up outside Philadelphia in Collingswood, New Jersey.  At age 6, his uncle gave him a Duane Eddy record and forever changed his life. He started playing the drums in a garage band when he was 12, then transitioned to the guitar. After school he would go to a local department store, where he would borrow the guitars and practice over chord sheets.

In 1983, he formed the Ben Vaughn Combo. The band was together five years, releasing two albums and touring the U.S. several times. They received rave reviews in Rolling Stone and People magazine and video airplay on MTV. The attention inspired Marshall Crenshaw to record Vaughn's "I'm Sorry (But So Is Brenda Lee)" for his Downtown album.

Vaughn embarked on a solo career in 1988, recording several critically acclaimed albums, touring extensively in Europe and the U.S., and receiving more MTV exposure. During that period he produced three records for the Elektra Records American Explorer series (Memphis rockabilly legend Charlie Feathers, Muscle Shoals country soul singer Arthur Alexander) and recorded "Cubist Blues" a collaboration with Alan Vega and Alex Chilton. He also scored two films (Favorite Mopar and Wild Girl's Go-Go Rama), as well as appearing as a frequent guest commentator on nationally syndicated radio shows Fresh Air and World Cafe.

In 1995, Vaughn moved to L.A. and released "Instrumental Stylings,"an album of instrumentals in a variety of styles.  A guest appearance on KCRW's "Morning Becomes Eclectic" led directly to being hired as the composer for the hit TV sitcom 3rd Rock from the Sun. That '70s Show soon followed, and for the next ten years Vaughn would provide award-winning music for a dozen other TV shows and pilots (Men Behaving Badly, Normal, Ohio, Grounded for Life). He also provided scores for several films (Psycho Beach Party, The Independent, Scorpion Spring) and continued producing records (Ween, Los Straitjackets, Mark Olson of the Jayhawks, Nancy Sinatra, and the Swingers soundtrack CD).

In 1997 Vaughn released the album Rambler'65. Recorded entirely in his car in a driveway in his hometown, this album (and subsequent short film) is still considered by many to be a classic document of a man and his dream.

Since then, Vaughn has released Designs in Music, Vaughn Sings Vaughn Vols. 1-3, Texas Road Trip (recorded in Austin, Texas, with Doug Sahm’s band), Five by Five, and Piece de Resistance by the Ben Vaughn Quintet, and the solo acoustic album Imitation Wood Grain and Other Folk Songs. His most recent release, The World of Ben Vaughn, coincided with Record Store Day 2022. Vaughn also had an Italian dance hit (a DJ re-mix of "Hey Romeo"), and his song "Jerry Lewis in France" was played on Bob Dylan’s radio program (complete with Dylan’s recitation of Vaughn's resume).

Occasionally, Vaughn takes a break from his syndicated radio show (The Many Moods of Ben Vaughn)  to perform live in the US and Europe. He toured Spain in June 2022.

Discography
 The Many Moods of Ben Vaughn (1986) (Restless – US) (Making Waves – UK)
 Beautiful Thing (1987) (Restless – US) (EMI – UK, Europe)
 Ben Vaughn Blows Your Mind (1988) (Restless – US) (Virgin – UK, Europe) (DRO – Spain)
 Dressed in Black (1990) (Enigma – US) (Demon – UK, Europe)
 Mood Swings (1991) (Restless – US) (Demon – UK, Europe)
 Mono US (1992) (Bar None – US) (Club De Musique – Italy) (Sky Ranch – France)
 Instrumental Stylings (1995) (Bar None – US)
 Cubist Blues (1996), with Alan Vega and Alex Chilton (Thirsty Ear - US) (Last Call - France), (reissued by Light In the Attic - US, Munster - Spain in 2006 with an extra disc recorded live)
 Rambler '65 (1997) (Rhino – US) (Munster – Spain)
 The Prehistoric Ben Vaughn (1998) (Munster – Spain)
 A Date with Ben Vaughn (1999) (Shoeshine – UK)
 Glasgow Time (2002) (Shoeshine – UK)
 Designs in Music (2005) (Soundstage 15 – US) (Munster - Spain)
 Vaughn Sings Vaughn, Vol.1 (2006) (Many Moods Records - US)
 Vaughn Sings Vaughn, Vol. 2 (2007) ( Many Moods Records - US)
 Vaughn Sings Vaughn, Vol. 3 (2007) (Many Moods Records - US)
 Texas Road Trip (2014) (Many Moods Records - US)
 Five By Five (2015) (MM Records US)
 Piece De Resistance (2016) (Many Moods Records - US / Kizmiaz rds - Eu)
 Imitation Wood Grain and Other Folk Songs (2018) (Many Moods Records - US)

References

External links
 Official website
 Interview on NPR

Year of birth missing (living people)
Living people
American male composers
Audubon High School (New Jersey) alumni
21st-century American composers
People from Collingswood, New Jersey
Restless Records artists
Enigma Records artists
Virgin Records artists
Bar/None Records artists
Rhino Records artists
21st-century American male musicians
Thirsty Ear Recordings artists